The Beechcraft Musketeer is a family of single-engined, low-wing, light aircraft that was produced by Beechcraft. The line includes the Model 19 Musketeer Sport, the Model 23 Musketeer, Custom and Sundowner, the Model 23-24 Musketeer Super III the retractable gear Model 24-R Sierra and the military CT-134 Musketeer.

The Musketeer line was in production from model years 1963 to 1983, during which time a total of 4,366 were produced. The type certificate for the Musketeer family of aircraft has been owned by Hawker Beechcraft since March 26, 2007.

Development

Model 23 Musketeer and Custom

The first of the line was the Model 23. This engine was not a success and was in turn replaced by the Lycoming O-360-A4J engine of  starting with the B23 Musketeer Custom of 1968. In 1970 the C23 version was introduced also under the name "Musketeer Custom". In 1972 the C23 was renamed the "Sundowner". When properly equipped, the B23 and C23 are approved for limited aerobatics.

A total of 2,331 Beechcraft 23s of all variants were manufactured by the time production was completed 20 years later in 1983.

Model 19 Musketeer Sport

The Beech 19 was introduced as a 1966 model year. Despite having a lower model number, it was a later variant and was a lower-powered trainer version of the Model 23. The Sport was introduced in 1966 with a standard price of $11,500. When properly equipped, the A19, B19, and M19 Sports are approved for limited aerobatics.

The Model 19 was named the "Musketeer Sport" and a total of 922 were built over the 15 years of production which ended with the 1979 model year.

Model 23-24 Musketeer Super III

Along with the introduction of the lower-powered Model 19 in 1966, Beechcraft also introduced a higher-powered version of the Model 23 Musketeer and named it the Beechcraft 23–24 Musketeer Super III. This upgraded model had a Lycoming IO-360 fuel injected powerplant which produced ,  more than the standard Model 23 Musketeer of that year. This model initially sold for a price of $16,350 in 1966.

In 1966 a single demonstration Model 23-24 was equipped with a constant speed propeller. In succeeding years approximately one third of production aircraft were delivered with the constant speed propeller.

The Super Musketeer typically has a useful load of 1050 to 1080 pounds – giving it one of the highest payloads of four-cylinder, fixed gear, simple single-engined aircraft available. Most Model 23-24s were produced in a four-seat configuration. A very small number were produced with a 4+2 configuration with the baggage area convertible to seat two children. This configuration option was more common on the Sierra models that followed the Model 23-24.

One of the few weaknesses of the Model 23-24 was that it had a simple heat distribution system that provided warm air via the firewall to the area under the instrument panel only. This meant heat to the rear seat passengers was less than optimal. Later aircraft featured increasingly better ducting designs that provided heat to all four seating positions.

The fixed-gear Model 23-24 was produced only between 1966 and 1969. A total of 369 Musketeer Super IIIs were completed before it was superseded by the Model 24 Sierra. These were serial numbered MA-1 to MA-369 and were the only models to have a "MA" serial number, making them easier to distinguish than other members of the Musketeer line.  In the last few airframes of the series a new instrument panel with the same "vertical tape" gauges that were used in the early Sierras was introduced. These models were known as the A24 and are not to be confused with the first Sierras, which were designated A24R models.  Other than the instrument panel these aircraft were mechanically identical to the earlier A23-24 model.

Model 24 Sierra

The Model 23-24 Musketeer Super III proved the utility of the  engine in the Musketeer airframe, but the fixed-gear configuration prevented using full advantage of the extra power of the injected Lycoming. The obvious solution was retracting the landing gear and this resulted in the Model 24R.

The Musketeer Super R, A24R in 1970 was the first model year for the new retractable version of the Musketeer to compete with the Piper Arrow.

Renamed the "Sierra", in 1972. The Model 24R completed the Beech line between the fixed gear Musketeers and the much larger, faster, more complex and expensive Beechcraft Bonanza.

1974 saw the introduction of the improved B24-R Sierra powered by the Lycoming IO-360-A1B6 engine and new propeller variant as a 1974 model year. The improved C24-R in 1977 was powered by the same engine and larger propeller. Beech also did an aerodynamic cleanup on the "C" model making it 6 knots faster than the "B" model it replaced in 1977 .

Sierra production ended at the same time as the Model 23 Sundowner assembly line was closed up, during the aviation economic downturn of 1983. A total of 744 Sierras were delivered.

The Musketeer design was further developed into a twin-engined aircraft, the Beechcraft Model 76 Duchess.

CT-134 Musketeer

The Canadian Forces purchased twenty-four 1971 model B23 Musketeers, with the first CT-134 arriving at CFB Portage la Prairie on March 23, 1971. The initial batch of CT-134s was replaced in late 1981 with twenty-four 1982 model Beechcraft C23 Sundowners, which were designated by the CF as CT-134A Musketeer II.

Design

Landing gear

A significant difference between the Musketeer line and other similar light aircraft is the Musketeer's landing gear. While the competitive Cessna 172s use spring-steel main gear, the Piper PA-28 Cherokees use oleo struts and the Grumman American AA-5s use fiberglass-sprung main gear, the Musketeer family use a trailing idler link gear system with compressed rubber pucks for shock absorption. This gives the aircraft quite different landing characteristics compared to the competition; light touchdowns are often accompanied by the idler links skipping and producing a landing that is less-graceful  than anticipated. Nevertheless, with practice, smooth landings are easy to accomplish.

As a result of this type of landing gear design, Beechcraft did not design or offer wheel fairings for the fixed gear models. Several aftermarket manufacturers have designed and tested wheel fairings for Musketeers.

Operational history

During their production years the Musketeer family of aircraft were popular trainers and were used by many flying schools. Most Musketeers are now privately owned.

Variants

23 Musketeer
A23 Musketeer II
A23A

A23-19 (Model 19)
A23-24
A24
19A
M19A
B19
B23

C23
A24R Sierra 200
B24R Sierra 200
C24R Sierra 200

Operators

Military operators
 
 Algerian Air Force (4 x B24R Sierra); no longer in service
 
 Canadian Armed Forces (24 x B23 and 24 x C23 Sundowners, designated as CT-134) until 1992 when they were replaced by Slingsby T67 Firefly
 
 Royal Hong Kong Auxiliary Air Force (2 x B23-19); retired in 1993 with disbanding of RHKAAF with GFS ordering Slingsby T67 Firefly

 Mexican Air Force (20 x A23-19); all retired

 Royal Moroccan Air Force (1 x 23); no longer in active service

Specifications

A23A Musketeer Custom III

See also

References

External links

 Airliners.net Musketeer page

Musketeer
1960s United States civil utility aircraft
1960s United States civil trainer aircraft
Single-engined tractor aircraft
Low-wing aircraft
Aircraft first flown in 1963